Movie Madness may refer to:
 Movie Madness Video, a video rental store in Portland, Oregon, in the United States
 National Lampoon's Movie Madness, a 1981 film
 Tiny Toon Adventures 2: Montana's Movie Madness, a 1993 video game

In television:
 "Movie Madness" (Even Stevens), 2001
 "Movie Madness", a 2001 two-part episode of Power Rangers Time Force
 "Movie Madness", a 2006 episode of Hi Hi Puffy AmiYumi
 "Movie Madness!", a 2013 episode of Team Umizoomi
 Movie Madness, a 2007–08 Cartoon Netowork programming block.